Neox (formerly Antena.Neox) is a Spanish television channel run by Atresmedia.

History
The channel was launched as Antena.Neox in 2005 together with Antena.Nova, this with the aim of strengthening the Antena 3 brand in the recently launched digital terrestrial television in Spain. At first Neox was a channel that mixed children's and youth programming.

In 2006 Antena 3 and CBS Corporation signed an agreement to broadcast content produced by CBS, Showtime and UPN, which would be programmed on Antena.Neox, Antena.Nova and Antena 3 until the Showtime and UPN brands were implemented on the Spanish television replacing Neox and Nova, however, the change was not carried out in the end due to the distribution of broadcasting rights with other Spanish channels. However, Antena 3 obtained the rights to broadcast future productions of CBS Corporation.

On January 1, 2009 Antena.Neox was renamed as Neox 8 in order to associate the channel with that logical channel number on digital terrestrial television. Finally, on August 6, 2010, it adopted the current name.

On December 30, 2011, the channel premiered "Feliz Año Neox", a special year-end program that is broadcast one day before the established date and which became an annual tradition of the channel. 

In 2013, the channel initiated a policy to improve children's programming with the introduction of Neox Kidz, a cartoon container that is broadcast in the morning. In May 2014, the channel added docuseries and movies to its programming due to the closure of Nitro, Xplora and la Sexta 3, in addition to adding new series and children's content to the signal.

In October 2017, the channel temporarily incorporated The Simpsons into its daytime program, because Antena 3's morning show had to be extended in its time to cover important political information at the time. Finally, in September 2018 The Simpsons began to be broadcast exclusively on Neox, completely abandoning Antena 3.

On May 23, 2019, the channel achieved its best audience record to date when 1,636,000 people tuned in to the final chapter of The Big Bang Theory, which meant a 9.8% audience at the time and an average of 4.4% daily audience.

Programming
Generally, the channel shows children's programmes during the morning, and films and general during the evening and night hours. The channel is geared towards children aged 7 to 14, and international successful series, such as Family Guy, How I Met Your Mother, The Big Bang Theory, Two and a Half Men, The Middle and Modern Family. It also builds on Antena 3's most popular programming, such as The Simpsons and The Goldbergs. The channel is available on digital terrestrial television (TDT as it is known in Spain) as well as cable and satellite.

References

External links
 

Television stations in Spain
Atresmedia Televisión
RTL Group
Spanish-language television stations
Television channels and stations established in 2005
2005 establishments in Spain
Atresmedia channels